Azniv Korkejian, known by her stage name Bedouine (born July 16), is a Syrian-American musician. She has lived in a number of cities and countries, including Saudi Arabia, Houston, Syria, and Boston.

History

Early life 
Korkejian was born in Aleppo, Syria, her family moved to Saudi Arabia where they lived until she was ten. Her family is Armenian. She was educated at an American school in Saudi Arabia and was exposed to the music of MTV as well as traditional Armenian and Arabic music. The family moved to the US after winning a green card lottery and lived first in Massachusetts and then later in Houston, Texas, where she went to high school. She studied sound design in Savannah, Georgia. She lives in Los Angeles, California.

Bedouine 

Bedouine released her first self-titled full-length album in 2017. The record includes sounds from her memories of her grandmother's home in Syria, specifically on "Summer Cold" and a song written in Armenian "Louise" (which translates to "light” and is written as Լոյս in Armenian). In an interview with Sound of Boston, Korkejian discussed writing the song in Western Armenian, the dialect her family speaks: “I was pretty shy about it because, like I said, my Armenian is kind of broken. But, I ran it by my cousin and kind of had his green light, and I got to a point where I just thought, even if it’s not perfect it’s okay because it’s still my experience.”

The album art of her debut album features a photograph taken of Bedouine on the black-and-white tiled floor of the console room outside Gus Seyffert's studio, where she recorded the album.

Bird Songs of a Killjoy 
In March 2019, Bedouine announced her second full-length album, Bird Songs of a Killjoy, which was released June 21, 2019. Her second record is influenced by her own wanderlust, displacement, and curiosity. It is a soundtrack to Spring blossom, to warm air on skin, to the concept of possibility. The twelve songs on Bird Songs of a Killjoy contain several references to birds, which initially panicked Azniv. “Oh no! What a cliché!” she recalls. "But I have to step back and take a breath. These songs are just where I landed, and that's OK." The album is produced by Gus Seyffert (Beck, Norah Jones).

Waysides 
Bedouine released her third full-length album, Waysides on October 22, 2021. The album was announced August 18, 2021 with the single "The Wave", which was written about the death of Bedouine's close friend and her resulting grief.
Korkejian did not write new material for the album, instead she selected and finished tracks from among her old demos, the oldest dating back 15 years, the newest from 2017. She’s described the process as “like spring cleaning, letting go to start anew”. All tracks were produced either by the singer herself or Gus Seyffert, who worked on both Bedouine and Bird Songs of a Killjoy.

Tours
Headline tours
 US Tour (Fall 2019)
 UK/EU Tour (Fall 2019)

Support tours
 Fleet Foxes (US Tour, Summer 2017)
 Matthew E. White (UK Tour, Fall 2017)
 Michael Kiwanuka (UK Tour, Fall 2017)
 José González (US Tour, Winter 2018)
 Real Estate (US Tour, Winter 2018)
 Waxahatchee / Hurray For The Riff Raff (US Tour, Spring 2018)
 Kevin Morby (US Tour, Summer 2018)
 Bahamas (US Tour, Fall 2018)
 Father John Misty (UK/EU Tour, Fall 2018)
 José González (EU Tour, Summer 2019)

Festivals
 Best Kept Secret (2018)
 Clandestino (2018)
 Likeminds (2018)
 Nelsonville Music Festival (2018)
 Newport Folk Festival (2018)
 Pickathon (2018)
 Waking Windows (2018)
 WOMAD (Australia) (2018)
 Calgary Folk Music Festival (2019)
 Huichica Music Festival (2019)

Discography
Studio albums
 Bedouine (2017, Spacebomb Records)
 Bird Songs of a Killjoy (2019, Spacebomb Records)
 Waysides (2021, Self-released)

Singles
 "Come Down In Time" (2018, Spacebomb Records)
 "The Hum" (2020, Spacebomb Records)
 "All My Trials" (2020, Mexican Summer)
 "Thirteen" (2020, Spacebomb Records)

References

Syrian musicians
American people of Syrian descent
21st-century American musicians
People from Aleppo
Spacebomb Records artists
Year of birth missing (living people)
Place of birth missing (living people)